Zavarzinella is an aerobic genus of bacteria from the family of Planctomycetaceae with one known species (Zavarzinella formosa). Zavarzinella formosa has been isolated from 
Sphagnum peat from West Siberia.

References

Bacteria genera
Monotypic bacteria genera
Planctomycetota